Nothomicrodon aztecarum is a species of Neotropical flies, originally described from a larva collected in 1924 from a carton nest of the ant Azteca trigona. It is the only species in the genus Nothomicrodon, but shows none of the features of a hoverfly larva, the family in which it was originally classified, and instead belongs in the family Phoridae.

References

Diptera of North America
Phoridae
Platypezoidea genera
Monotypic Brachycera genera
Taxa named by William Morton Wheeler